Arkansas Highway 27 (AR 27, Ark. 27, and Hwy. 27) is a designation for two north–south state highways in Arkansas. One route begins at US Highway 59 (US 59) and US 71 near Ben Lomond north to Highway 7 in Dardanelle. A second segment begins at Highway 7 in Dover and runs north to Highway 14 at Harriet. An original Arkansas state highway, Highway 27 was created as one continuous route in 1926, but was split around Russellville in 1961.

The designation also includes Highway 27 Business, a business route in Nashville, and Highway 27N, a former alternate route near Ben Lomond deleted in the 1990s. All highways are maintained by the Arkansas State Highway and Transportation Department (AHTD).

Route description

Ben Lomond to Dardanelle
AR 27 begins at US 59/US 71 near Ben Lomond. The route runs east, meeting AR 317 before meeting AR 355 in Mineral Springs. The route continues to Nashville where it meets US 278 and US 371/AR 24. North of Nashville, AR 27 meets AR 26 until Murfreesboro, when it picks up AR 19.

The route winds north to meet US 70/AR 84 in Kirby. AR 27 follows US 70 until Glenwood, when it meets AR 8 and enters the Ouachita National Forest. The two routes run together until Norman. AR 27 continues northeast to US 270 in Mt. Ida, and then to Washita where it meets AR 298. The route eventually leaves the forest near Rover, which contains a junction with AR 28.

AR 27 meets AR 10 in Danville and continues north to Dardanelle. The route meets AR 7/AR 22/AR 247 on the south edge of town. It then crosses the Arkansas River into Russellville, where it meets US 64 in downtown, and Interstate 40 north of town.

Dover to Harriet
A concurrency with AR 7 ends in Dover, with AR 27 turning right at Market Street.

The route winds northward for a stretch, eventually meeting AR 16 and AR 333 in rural Searcy County. AR 27 continues northeast to meet US 65/AR 74 in Marshall. After Marshall, the route trails north to Harriet, where it terminates at AR 14.

History
Highway 27 was created during the 1926 Arkansas state highway numbering as an original state highway between Ben Lomond and Harriet. The segment between Highway 28 at Rover and Highway 10 in Danville was deleted in 1929, but it was restored in 1931.

Following construction of new terrain routes for Highway 7 and Highway 22, Highway 27 was truncated at the new alignment of Highway 7 in Dardanelle. This action separated the highway into its two present-day sections.

The highway was in Marshall on March 11, 1954, in Mt. Ida on June 27, 1962., between Hector and Tilly (approximately ) on March 24, 1971, and between Ben Lomond and Mineral Springs on September 29, 1976.

Major intersections
Mile markers reset at some concurrencies.

Special routes
Arkansas Highway 27 had two auxiliary routes, with AR 27N being removed in the 1990s.

Nashville business route
Arkansas Highway 27B is a business route in Nashville.

Former route

Arkansas Highway 27N was a short east–west highway in southwest Arkansas. In the 1990s Highway 27N was replaced by a realigned Highway 27.

See also

References

External links

027
Transportation in Sevier County, Arkansas
Transportation in Howard County, Arkansas
Transportation in Hempstead County, Arkansas
Transportation in Pike County, Arkansas
Transportation in Montgomery County, Arkansas
Transportation in Yell County, Arkansas
Transportation in Pope County, Arkansas
Transportation in Van Buren County, Arkansas
Transportation in Searcy County, Arkansas